The commune is the third-level divisions of Haiti. The 10 departments have 42 arrondissements, which are divided into 144 communes and then into 571 communal sections.
 Communes are roughly equivalent to civil townships and incorporated municipalities.

Administration

Each commune has a municipal council (conseil municipal) compound of three members elected by the inhabitants of the commune for a 4-year term. The municipal council is led by a president often called mayor.

Each commune has a municipal assembly (assemblée municipale) who assists the council in its work.
The members of the assembly are also elected for 4 years.

Each commune is ruled by a municipality.

List

Artibonite
Dessalines Arrondissement
Dessalines
Desdunes
Grande-Saline
Petite Rivière de l'Artibonite
Gonaïves Arrondissement
Gonaïves
Ennery
L'Estère
Gros Morne Arrondissement
Gros-Morne
Anse-Rouge
Terre-Neuve
Marmelade Arrondissement
Marmelade
Saint-Michel-de-l'Atalaye
Saint-Marc Arrondissement
Saint-Marc
La Chapelle
Liancourt
Verrettes
Montrouis

Centre
Cerca-la-Source Arrondissement
Cerca-la-Source
Thomassique
Hinche Arrondissement
Hinche
Cerca-Carvajal
Maïssade
Thomonde
Lascahobas Arrondissement
Lascahobas
Baptiste
Belladère
Savanette
Mirebalais Arrondissement
Mirebalais
Boucan-Carré
Saut-d'Eau

Grand'Anse
Anse d'Hainault Arrondissement
Anse-d'Hainault
Dame-Marie
Les Irois
Corail Arrondissement
Beaumont
Corail
Pestel
Roseaux
Jérémie Arrondissement
Jérémie
Abricots
Bonbon
Chambellan
Marfranc
Moron

Nippes
Anse-à-Veau Arrondissement
Anse-à-Veau
Arnaud
L'Asile
Petit-Trou-de-Nippes
Plaisance-du-Sud 
Baradères Arrondissement
Baradères
Grand-Boucan
Miragoâne Arrondissement
Miragoâne
Fonds-des-Nègres
Paillant
Petite-Rivière-de-Nippes

Nord
Acul-du-Nord Arrondissement
Acul-du-Nord
Milot
Plaine-du-Nord
Borgne Arrondissement
Borgne
Port-Margot
Cap-Haïtien Arrondissement
Cap-Haïtien
Limonade
Quartier-Morin
Grande-Rivière-du-Nord Arrondissement
Grande-Rivière-du-Nord
Bahon
Limbé Arrondissement
Limbé
Bas-Limbé
Plaissance Arrondissement
Plaisance
Pilate
Saint-Raphaël Arrondissement
Saint-Raphaël
Dondon
La Victoire
Pignon
 Ranquitte

Nord-Est
Fort-Liberté Arrondissement
Fort-Liberté
Perches
Ferrier
Ouanaminthe Arrondissement
Ouanaminthe
Capotille
Mont-Organisé
Trou-du-Nord Arrondissement
Trou-du-Nord
Caracol
Sainte-Suzanne
Grand-Bassin et Terrier-Rouge
Vallières Arrondissement
Vallières
Carice
Mombin-Crochu

Nord-Ouest
Môle-Saint-Nicolas Arrondissement
Môle-Saint-Nicolas
Baie-de-Henne
Bombardopolis
Jean-Rabel
Port-de-Paix Arrondissement
Port-de-Paix
Bassin-Bleu
Chansolme
Lapointe
La Tortue
Saint-Louis-du-Nord Arrondissement
Saint-Louis-du-Nord
Anse-à-Foleur

Ouest
Arcahaie Arrondissement
Arcahaie
Cabaret
Croix-des-Bouquets Arrondissement
Croix-des-Bouquets
Cornillon
Fonds-Verrettes
Ganthier
Thomazeau
La Gonâve Arrondissement
Anse-à-Galets
Pointe-à-Raquette
Léogâne Arrondissement
Léogâne
Grand-Goâve
Petit-Goâve
Port-au-Prince Arrondissement
Port-au-Prince
Carrefour
Cité Soleil
Delmas
Gressier
Kenscoff
Pétion-Ville
Tabarre

Sud-Est
Bainet Arrondissement
Bainet
Côtes-de-Fer
Belle-Anse Arrondissement
Belle-Anse
Anse-à-Pitres
Grand-Gosier
Thiotte
Jacmel Arrondissement
Jacmel
Cayes-Jacmel
La Vallée
Marigot

Sud
Aquin Arrondissement
Aquin
Cavaillon
Saint-Louis-du-Sud
Fond des Blancs
Les Cayes Arrondissement
Les Cayes
Camp-Perrin
Chantal
Île-à-Vache
Maniche
Torbeck
Chardonnières Arrondissement
Chardonnières
Les Anglais
Tiburon
Côteaux Arrondissement
Côteaux
Port-à-Piment
Roche-à-Bateaux
Port-Salut Arrondissement
Port-Salut
Arniquet
Saint-Jean-du-Sud

References

External links
Code Postal Haitien
Haiti-Référence 7320. - Arrondissements et communes d’Haiti

See also
Haiti
Departments of Haiti
Arrondissements of Haiti
Communal section

Communes, Haiti
 
Subdivisions of Haiti
Haiti 3
Haiti geography-related lists